Somatidia corticola is a species of beetle in the family Cerambycidae. It was described by Broun in 1913. It is known from New Zealand.

References

corticola
Beetles described in 1913